Jindřich Jirsák (27 February 1885 – 1938) was a Czech athlete. He competed in the men's pole vault at the 1912 Summer Olympics, representing Bohemia.

References

1885 births
1938 deaths
Athletes (track and field) at the 1912 Summer Olympics
Czech male pole vaulters
Olympic athletes of Bohemia
Place of birth missing
Sportspeople from the Austro-Hungarian Empire